Kuzeh Kanan (also Romanized as Kūzeh Kanān, Kūzeh Konān, and Koozeh Kanan; also known as Kūzeh Yukan and Kyuza-Yukan) is a city in the Central District of Shabestar County, East Azerbaijan province, Iran. At the 2006 census, its population was 3,524 in 892 households. The following census in 2011 counted 3,274 people in 917 households. The latest census in 2016 showed a population of 4,730 people in 1,536 households.

References 

Shabestar County

Cities in East Azerbaijan Province

Populated places in East Azerbaijan Province

Populated places in Shabestar County